Hello Trouble is a 1932 American pre-Code Western movie directed by Lambert Hillyer. The film stars Buck Jones and Lina Basquette.

Cast

 Buck Jones as Ranger Jeff Douglas
 Lina Basquette as Janet Kenyon
 Wallace Macdonald as Le Tange
 Spee O'Donnell as Joey
 Ruth Warren as Emmy
 Otto Hoffman as Calvin Sharp
 Ward Bond as Kennedy
 Frank Rice as Hardpan
 Russell Simpson as Jonathan Kenyon
 Alan Roscoe as Gregg
 Morgan Galloway as Johnny Boyle
 Lafe Mckee as Sherriff Edwards
 Al Smith as Vaughn

References

External links
 

1932 films
American black-and-white films
1932 Western (genre) films
American Western (genre) films
Films directed by Lambert Hillyer
Columbia Pictures films
1930s English-language films